Levon Khechoyan (8 December 1955 – 8 January 2014) was an Armenian writer and novelist.

Biography 
Khechoyan was born in the village of Baraleti, Akhalkalaki district, Georgian SSR. Since 1987 he lived and worked in Hrazdan, Armenia. In 1983 he graduated from the Gyumri State Pedagogical Institute receiving an M.A. in philology. Khechoyan participated in the first Artsakh War.

He started writing as a teenager, and his first collection of short stories, Trees of Incense, was published in 1991. Khechoyan is the author of historical novel King Arshak and Eunuch Drastamat. Many of his works have been translated into Russian, English and Ukrainian. In 2000, he received the Gold Reed literary award for his book ‘Black Book, Heavy Bug’.

In 2013, he refused to accept the Medal for Services to the Homeland granted by President Serzh Sargsyan in protest against the socioeconomic and political situation in the country.

References

External links 
 Biography
 Writer Levon Khechoyan dies
 Левон Хечоян

1955 births
2014 deaths
People from Samtskhe–Javakheti
Shirak State University alumni
Armenian military personnel of the Nagorno-Karabakh War
21st-century Armenian male writers
Armenian novelists
Armenian male novelists
20th-century novelists
20th-century Armenian novelists
21st-century Armenian novelists
20th-century male writers
21st-century male writers